An ensign is the national flag flown on a vessel to indicate nationality. The ensign is the largest flag, generally flown at the stern (rear) of the ship while in port. The naval ensign (also known as war ensign), used on warships, may be different from the civil ensign (merchant ships) or the yacht ensign (recreational boats). Large versions of naval ensigns called battle ensigns are used when a warship goes into battle. The ensign differs from the jack, which is flown from a jackstaff at the bow of a vessel.

In its widest sense, an ensign is just a flag or other standard. The European military rank of ensign, once responsible for bearing a unit's standard (whether national or regimental), derives from it (in the cavalry, the equivalent rank was cornet, named after a type of flag). 
Ensigns, such as the ancient Roman ensigns in the Arch of Constantine, are not always flags.

National ensigns
In nautical use, the ensign is flown on a ship or boat to indicate its organizational membership. While this includes its nationality, it may indicate more information (e.g. civilian, naval, or police vessel) rather than being the national flag itself. This is particularly common for European and Commonwealth countries.

Ensigns are usually at the stern flagstaff when in port, and may be shifted to a gaff (if available) or mast amidships when the ship is under way, becoming known as a steaming ensign.

Vexillologists distinguish three varieties of a national flag when used as an ensign:
A civil ensign (usage symbol ) is worn by merchant and pleasure vessels. In some countries the yacht ensign, used on recreational boats or ships instead of merchant vessels, differs from the civil ensign.
A state ensign or government ensign (usage symbol ) is worn by government vessels, such as coast guard ships.
A naval ensign (usage symbol ) is used by a country's navy.

Many countries do not distinguish among these uses, and employ only one national flag and ensign in all cases; in the United States, for example, all ships of the seagoing services of the United States Government with the exception of the United States Coast Guard fly the national flag as their ensign, although the ships of some agencies also fly an agency flag as a "distinctive mark." Other countries (like the United Kingdom, Ukraine, Italy, Russia, South Africa, Australia, New Zealand, and Japan) use different ensigns. Such ensigns are strictly regulated and indicate if the vessel is a warship, a merchant ship, a ship under contract to carry mail, or a yacht, for example.

Several Commonwealth countries' national flags had their origin in the ensigns of their original colonising power, the United Kingdom. Most notable of these national flags are those of Australia, New Zealand, and several smaller island nations.  It is also very likely that the Grand Union Flag from which the flag of the United States developed was strongly influenced by the British Red Ensign or the flag of the (British controlled) East India Company.

Air ensigns
With the creation of independent air forces and the growth in civil aviation in the first half of the 20th century, a range of distinguishing flags and ensigns were adopted.  These may be divided into air force ensigns (often light blue in colour, such as the Royal Air Force Ensign) and civil air ensigns.

Heraldic ensigns
In heraldry, an ensign is the ornament or sign, such as the crown, coronet, or mitre, borne above the charge or arms.

Gallery

See also 

 Distinctive mark
 Maritime flag
 Jack

References

Sources

External links

 
Types of flags
Maritime culture